Between 1996 and 2002 the English National Health Service was organised under the following health authorities.

In 2002 the health authorities were reorganised and their boundaries changed to constitute 28 strategic health authorities, which were reduced in number to 10 in 2006.

Prior to 1996 the service was organised according to regional health authorities.

‡ also included part of High Peak in Derbyshire (East Midlands)

These Health Authorities were established in 1996.  There were a few changes between then and the final form shown above.   There were originally separate authorities for Barnet and Enfield & Haringey, for Bexley & Greenwich and Bromley, for East & North Hertfordshire and South Hertfordshire, and for the Isle of Wight & Portsmouth and South-East Hampshire.    Also, the area of Norfolk and Cambridgeshire was partitioned between three authorities : Cambridge & Huntingdon, East Norfolk, and North West Anglia.  North West Anglia included from Cambridgeshire: Peterborough, Fenland, part of Huntingdonshire, and from Norfolk: King's Lynn and West Norfolk and part of Breckland.  

Also, "East Riding and Hull" was originally known as "East Riding", "County Durham and Darlington" was originally known as "County Durham"

See also
 Area health authority
 District health authority

References

Defunct National Health Service organisations
Health Authorities (1996)
Former subdivisions of England